Luminescence is emission of light by a substance not resulting from heat.

Luminescence may also refer to:

 Luminescence (EP), a 2009 EP by Neon Highwire
 Luminescence (album), a 2005 album by Anggun
 IV: Luminescence, a 2017 album by Boulevard
 Luminescence (journal), a scientific journal
 Luminescence!, a 1967 album by Barry Harris

See also
 Luminescent (album), an album by The Sunshine Underground
 Luminance (disambiguation)